Bonamia fruticosa is a shrub in the family Convolvulaceae.

The shrub in the Kimberley region of Western Australia.

References

fruticosa
Plants described in 2014